Enis Ibush Bunjaki (born 17 October 1997) is a professional footballer who plays as a forward for SC Hessen Dreieich. Born in Germany, he made two appearances for the Kosovo national team in 2014 before representing Germany at youth levels U18, U19 and U20.

Club career

Early career
Bunjaki was born in Offenbach am Main, Germany from Kosovar-Albanian parents. He started his youth career at hometown club Kickers Offenbach. Then he moved to Eintracht Frankfurt academies in 2011 and two years later he was promoted to U17 side where he stood for two years. In 2014 without completing the age of 17, Bunjaki was promoted to the U19 team. With Eintracht Frankfurt U19 in the 2014–15 season Bunjaki scored 15 goals in 25 appearances. His performances caught the eye of the coach of the Eintracht Frankfurt first team Thomas Schaaf, which often brought him for training with the first team, while also enabled through friendly matches, while then the new appointed Eintracht Frankfurt's coach Armin Veh, has estimated extremely young striker, advising the club to offer a contract professional. Bunjaki played for the Eintracht Frankfurt first team under the coach Thomas Schaaf on 10 July 2014 on day four of SGE's first training camp this summer on Norderney island. Eintracht Frankfurt beat local team TuS Norderney 10–0 and Bunjaki also scored two goals after coming on as a substitute at half-time in place of Takashi Inui.

Eintracht Frankfurt
On 22 June 2015, Bunjaki signed his first professional contract of career with Eintracht Frankfurt for 2+1 years. The contract took effect on 17 October 2015 on Bunjaki's 18th birthday but he would have entry to the first team on 1 July 2015 when the new season officially starts.

Twente
Bunjaki signed with Dutch side FC Twente on 31 January 2017. He made his debut on 5 February 2017 against Feyenoord.

International career

Kosovo
Bunjaki was called up to Kosovo national team for friendly matches against Turkey and Senegal in May 2014. He made it his debut for Kosovo on 25 May 2014 against Senegal in a 3–1 loss coming on as a substitute in place of the goalscorer Albert Bunjaku. Bunjaki was called up for another Kosovo's friendly match against Oman on 7 September 2014. Against Oman, he came in as a substitute in the 83rd minute for Bersant Celina and the match finished as a historical 1–0 victory since being first from where FIFA permitted their matches.

Germany youth teams
Bunjaki participated in seven friendly matches with Germany U18, where he scored four goals between 2014 and 2015. He advanced at Germany U19 and the next year at Germany U20 after another year.

Career statistics

Club

International

References

External links

1997 births
Living people
Sportspeople from Offenbach am Main
German footballers
Germany youth international footballers
Kosovan footballers
Kosovo international footballers
Association football forwards
Eredivisie players
Eintracht Frankfurt players
FC Twente players
Kosovan expatriate footballers
German expatriate footballers
Kosovo Albanians
German people of Kosovan descent
German people of Albanian descent
Kosovan expatriate sportspeople in the Netherlands
German expatriate sportspeople in the Netherlands
Expatriate footballers in the Netherlands
Footballers from Hesse
Hessenliga players
TSV Eintracht Stadtallendorf players
Jong FC Twente players